Helge Andersson may refer to:

Helge Andersson (footballer, born 1897), Swedish footballer, died 1976
Helge Andersson (footballer, born 1907), Swedish footballer, died 1960